Taman P. Ramlee (formerly Taman Furlong) is a township located in the suburb of Setapak, Kuala Lumpur. The P. Ramlee Memorial is located here.

References

Suburbs in Kuala Lumpur